Nova Arianto Sartono (born 4 November 1978) is an Indonesian professional football coach and former player of Chinese Indonesian descent who last played for Pelita Bandung Raya as a defender and currently works as an assistant coach for Indonesia national under-19 football team under Shin Tae-yong.

Biography
Nova Arianto, who is a Roman Catholic, played for a very long time in Persebaya before leaving for Persib. He is used to scoring goals from corner kicks. He has played 112 times for Persib and scored 8 goals. He is the son of Persibo Bojonegoro coach Sartono Anwar and Tan Djiet Nio.

Sartono Anwar is a well-known coach who led PSIS Semarang to win the 1987 Premier Division and became one of the national team coaches from the 1980s to early 90s.

Finally, Sartono Anwar, who has also trained UMS Jakarta (Galatama), BPD Central Java (Galatama), Assyabaab Salim Group, Petrokimia Putra, Arseto Solo, Putra Samarinda, Persibo Bojonegoro led Persisam Putra Samarinda.

International career
Nova made his debut for Indonesia in 2008 and has scored 1 goal against Thailand in the 2008 AFF Suzuki Cup.

The problem is that he rarely starts the first eleven for Indonesia and usually stays in the bench. He could not play in the 2010 AFF Suzuki Cup due to injury.

International goals

Honours

Club honors
Persebaya Surabaya
Liga Indonesia (1): 2004
First Division (2): 2003, 2006

Sriwijaya
Indonesia Super League (1): 2011–12

Country honors
Indonesia U-18
Asian Schools Championship (1): 1996

Indonesia
Indonesian Independence Cup (1): 2008

Individual honors
First Division Best player (1): 2006

References

Living people
1978 births
People from Semarang
Indonesian people of Chinese descent
Indonesian sportspeople of Chinese descent
Indonesian Roman Catholics
Indonesian footballers
Arseto F.C. players
PSIS Semarang players
Persebaya Surabaya players
PSS Sleman players
Persib Bandung players
Sriwijaya F.C. players
Pelita Bandung Raya players
Indonesian Premier Division players
Liga 1 (Indonesia) players
Association football defenders
Sportspeople from Central Java